Roni Schwartz (born 26 January 1984) is an Israeli judoka.

She won the 6 bronze medals in the IJF World Tour, 3 of them in Grand Slam tournaments.

References

External links
 
 

1984 births
Living people
Israeli female judoka
Jewish martial artists
Jewish Israeli sportspeople
Israeli female athletes
Israeli Jews
European Games competitors for Israel
Judoka at the 2015 European Games